Joelle Louise Murray (born 7 November 1986) is a Scottish international footballer who plays as a defender for Hibernian of the Scottish Women's Premier League.

Murray grew up in Chirnside, Scotland, and started her career playing with local boys' clubs. At the age of 12 she joined the youth set-up at Hibernian Ladies. She progressed through the age groups and into the senior side, winning all domestic honours along the way and latterly being under-17 captain. Murray made her UEFA Women's Cup debut in July 2004 against Rapide Wezemaal and has made six appearances in the competition to date.

After being called up to the Scotland Under-17 squad in 2002, Murray came through the various age-group teams and made her full international debut against Belgium in August 2007. She scored her first international goal against Northern Ireland in a May 2009 challenge match.

International goals
Scores and results list Scotland's goal tally first.

References

External links

Hibernian Ladies profile

1986 births
Living people
Scottish women's footballers
Scotland women's international footballers
Hibernian W.F.C. players
Women's association football midfielders
2019 FIFA Women's World Cup players
People from Berwickshire
Sportspeople from the Scottish Borders
UEFA Women's Euro 2017 players